Ethel M. McGary (October 21, 1907 – May 5, 1975), also known by her married name Ethel Engelsen, was an American competition swimmer who represented the United States at the 1928 Summer Olympics in Amsterdam.  McGary competed in the semifinals of the women's 400-meter freestyle.

See also
 World record progression 800 metres freestyle
 World record progression 1500 metres freestyle

External links
 

1907 births
1975 deaths
American female freestyle swimmers
World record setters in swimming
Olympic swimmers of the United States
Sportspeople from New York City
Swimmers at the 1928 Summer Olympics
20th-century American women
20th-century American people